Jiaotanzhuang is a town in the Taihang Mountains of Pingshan County in western Hebei province, China, located  northwest of the county seat. , it has 20 villages under its administration.

See also
List of township-level divisions of Hebei

References

Township-level divisions of Hebei
Pingshan County, Hebei